Nataliya Yakovchuk (born 29 July 1975) is a Kazakhstani ice hockey player. She competed in the women's tournament at the 2002 Winter Olympics.

References

1975 births
Living people
Kazakhstani women's ice hockey players
Olympic ice hockey players of Kazakhstan
Ice hockey players at the 2002 Winter Olympics
Sportspeople from Almaty
Asian Games medalists in ice hockey
Ice hockey players at the 1999 Asian Winter Games
Ice hockey players at the 2003 Asian Winter Games
Ice hockey players at the 2011 Asian Winter Games
Medalists at the 1999 Asian Winter Games
Medalists at the 2003 Asian Winter Games
Medalists at the 2011 Asian Winter Games
Asian Games gold medalists for Kazakhstan
Asian Games bronze medalists for Kazakhstan